Marcela Campagnoli (born 11 November 1957) is an Argentine politician, currently serving as National Deputy elected in Buenos Aires Province since 2017. She is a member of the Civic Coalition ARI, and sits in the Juntos por el Cambio parliamentary inter-bloc.

Early life and career
Campagnoli was born on 11 November 1957 in Buenos Aires. She studied to be a professor of history at the Consejo Superior de Educación Católica, graduating in 1986. She then went on to complete a law degree from the University of Buenos Aires in 1996. She is married to Guillermo Iglesias, and has two children.

Political career
Campagnoli was elected to the city council of Pilar in 2007, serving until 2011. Then, from 2015 to 2017, she was Secretary of Education at the municipality of Pilar, in the administration of intendente Nicolás Ducoté.

She ran for a seat in the Chamber of Deputies in the 2017 legislative election, as the fourth candidate in the Cambiemos list in Buenos Aires Province. The list was the most voted in the general election with 42.15% of the vote, and Campagnoli was elected.

As a national deputy, Campagnoli formed part of the parliamentary commissions on Criminal Legislation (of which she was appointed first vice-president), Human Rights and Guarantees, Education and Freedom of Expression. Campagnoli was an opponent of the legalization of abortion in Argentina. She voted against the two Voluntary Interruption of Pregnancy bills that were debated by the Argentine Congress in 2018 and 2020.

In April 2021, she tested positive for COVID-19.

Ahead of the 2021 primary election, Campagnoli was confirmed as one of the candidates in the "Es Juntos" list in Buenos Aires Province.

Electoral history

References

External links

Profile on the official website of the Chamber of Deputies (in Spanish)

Living people
1957 births
Members of the Argentine Chamber of Deputies elected in Buenos Aires Province
Women members of the Argentine Chamber of Deputies
Politicians from Buenos Aires
Civic Coalition ARI politicians
21st-century Argentine politicians
21st-century Argentine women politicians